The Robert Simpson Company Limited, commonly known as Simpson's until 1972, then as Simpsons, and in Quebec sometimes as Simpson, was a Canadian department store chain that had its earliest roots in a store opened in 1858 by Robert Simpson.

In 1952 Simpson's started a 50-50 joint venture in Canada named Simpsons-Sears Limited (later Sears Canada) with Sears, Roebuck, the American retailer. Simpsons-Sears stores remained distinct from the Simpson's stores and the parent companies' agreement included language to keep them from competing too directly with each other.

The Hudson's Bay Company (HBC) purchased the Simpsons-branded stores in 1978, but they were later converted to The Bay stores by the early 1990s. As part of the 1978 agreement, U.S.-based Sears acquired full ownership of Simpsons-Sears Limited.

History 

Robert Simpson's original store (Simpson & Bogart after 1861), was opened in 1858 in Newmarket, Ontario at what is now 226-228 Main Street South (original building since demolished). 
it was co-founded with William Trent as Simpson & Trent Groceries, Boots, Shoes and Dry Goods. A fire destroyed the store in 1870, and a new dry goods store was opened two years later in Toronto. Robert Simpson lived at 384 Botsford Street in Newmarket from 1861 to 1876.

The company was renamed the Robert Simpson Company Limited in May 1896, not long before Robert Simpson's sudden death on 14 December 1897, at the age of 63. With no male heir, Simpson's death placed a heavy burden on his wife, Mary, and daughter, Margaret. They sold the business for $135,000 in March 1898 to a syndicate of three Toronto businessmen, Harris Henry Fudger  (1852-1930), Joseph Flavelle, and Alfred Ernest Ames (1866-1934).

In 1912, Charles Luther (C.L.) Burton became assistant general manager at the Robert Simpson Company, then under the directorship of his old friend and mentor, H. H. Fudger. By 1929, Burton was president of Simpson's, becoming chairman of the board in 1948, when his son Edgar assumed the presidency.

The store in downtown Toronto included one of the city's most exclusive restaurants, the Arcadian Court, which opened in 1929 and still operates today (as an event space) after the store's acquisition by Hudson's Bay Company in 1978. Throughout its history, Simpsons was the traditional carriage-trade department store in Toronto, competing with the T. Eaton Company. The motto "You'll enjoy shopping at Simpson's" was conceived by Robert Simpson and remained the company's slogan until its acquisition by the Hudson's Bay Company.

Simpsons-Sears

In 1952, General Robert E. Wood, the Chairman of U.S. retailer Sears, Roebuck and Co., sent a letter to Edgar G. Burton, President of the Robert Simpson Company of Toronto, proposing a partnership between their two companies in order to serve the Canadian market. The deal to create Simpsons-Sears Limited, a Canadian catalogue and department store chain separate from the Simpsons chain, was signed on September 18, 1952, and the terms were 50-50. Each company put up $20 million and had equal representation on the new company's Board of Directors. The new company was to have two main objectives. The first was to expand Simpsons' existing mail-order business, which was sold to the new company. The second goal was to build a string of stores modelled on Sears, Roebuck's format right across the country.

The agreement also contained a provision that would prove to be a major bone of contention in the coming years. Under its terms, Simpsons-Sears could not open a retail store within 25 miles of Simpson's existing stores in Toronto, Montreal, Halifax, Regina and London. In return, Simpson's promised not to build any stores outside of those five cities. Simpsons-Sears mail-order business, however, was free to operate anywhere in Canada, and so was the new Simpsons-Sears Acceptance Company, the credit arm of the operation.

The business operations of Simpsons-Sears began when the first Simpsons-Sears Spring/Summer Catalogue rolled off the presses of Photo-Engravers and Electrotypers, Ltd. and were delivered to 300,000 Canadian homes in early 1953.

On Thursday, September 17, 1953, the first Simpsons-Sears retail store opened in Stratford, Ontario at 9:15 a.m. The second Simpsons-Sears store opened in Kamloops, B.C., in December of that year.

In the 1960s, Simpson's was among the first 10 Canadian companies to start using computers in all their locations, and programming was done in Toronto and Montreal by accounting clerks, many of whom were women. Enormous rooms with special ventilation were built to house IBM punch card mainframe machines in those two locations.

In 1972, Simpsons and Simpsons-Sears agreed to end the 25-mile restriction and permit Simpsons and Simpsons-Sears stores anywhere.

Acquisition by the Hudson's Bay Company

In 1978, the Hudson's Bay Company acquired Simpsons and federal competition law required the partnership to terminate, thus Simpsons and Simpsons-Sears could no longer share facilities. Sears stores continued to carry the Simpsons-Sears name on signage and the name remained in use both informally and as its business name well into the 1980s. Simpsons-Sears officially changed its name to Sears Canada in 1984.

Simpsons closed on June 27, 1981 the store in Regina, Saskatchewan it had operated since 1916 after four consecutive years of financial losses with that location.  It also closed its only store in Ottawa on January 29, 1983. The 83,000 square feet multi-level store had never been profitable ever since Simpsons acquired it in June 1972 and was notorious for not having any escalators.

In March 1983, The Bay store at Mayflower Mall in Sydney, Nova Scotia was rebranded to Simpsons.

In July 1984, Simpsons terminated 1,631 employees, including more than a thousand in Toronto alone. Simpsons lost $53 million that year alone.

The flagship store's acquisition of a large quantity of toy robots was a major plot point in the movie Short Circuit 2 in 1988.

Simpsons vanished in 1989 from Greater Montreal with its five stores either converted to The Bay or simply closed, leaving the chain with a presence only in the Toronto area.   HBC acknowledged at the time that Simpsons wasn't doing well in Toronto but was still performing well enough to continue there and even planned to add three more locations to the existing 11 stores in the area. That year, the flagship Simpsons store in downtown Toronto completed a $30 million facelift with a relaunch known as the Miracle on Queen Street. Its cosmetics area was reputed to be the largest in the world and the basement featured a gourmet food hall similar to Macy's in Herald Square in New York City or Harrods in London.  The St. Regis Room expanded and upscale shops such as Alfred Dunhill of London opened boutiques in the store.

The end
The Hudson's Bay Company attempted to operate Simpsons as a more-upscale nameplate than its main brand, The Bay, but was unsuccessful. The chain's remaining operations in Greater Toronto were merged with The Bay in 1991 and the Simpsons name was retired after a retail presence of almost 120 years. 

Reasons for the Hudson's Bay Company's decision were the recession and the fact that it rarely made profits with the Simpsons stores ever since the acquisition in the late 1970s. Simpsons struggled to stand out from The Bay. Although Simpsons was slightly higher end than The Bay, the distinction was hardly noticeable to the average shopper. The Hudson's Bay Company came to the conclusion that it would be better to rationalize its operations than to divide its customer base. Much of the operations of Simpsons and The Bay (purchasing, advertising, credit cards) had already been consolidated by the time HBC decided to merge the chains.  The Simpsons chain also suffered from an identity crisis within itself, with an upscale flagship downtown store filled with high-end merchandise in contrast to the mid-priced suburban mall locations that were basically like The Bay. When the merger was announced in June 1991, it had been suggested that the downtown location continue operating as a Simpsons store but HBC turned down the idea under the explanation that it would be too expensive to implement such plan.

Finally, the demise of Simpsons came at a time when the Hudson's Bay Company was seriously controlling its operating costs in preparation of an eventual entrance to Canada by American giant Wal-Mart which was already conquering the retail landscape in its country and attracting Canadians living close to the border.

Legacy

The Simpsons store on Queen Street West in Toronto continues to operate under the Hudson's Bay nameplate as the chain's, and Canada's, largest department store.  The adjacent Simpson Tower, which used to house Simpsons offices, served as the main headquarters for the Hudson's Bay Company until the mid-2010s which still maintains some activities in the building.

In 1991, Sears Canada acquired several Simpsons locations in the Toronto market, primarily where HBC had both Bay and Simpsons stores operating within the same shopping centre. When Simpsons folded in 1991, eight of its stores were absorbed by The Bay. The other six Simpsons stores were sold to Sears. Sears also acquired two existing The Bay stores at the Scarborough Town Centre and Yorkdale shopping malls. On the other hand, the Sears store at the Burlington Mall was sold to The Bay. The stores that went to The Bay were all rebranded on August 14, 1991. The locations that Sears acquired were closed in July 1991, renovated and progressively reopened at various dates in August and September 1991 with the former Simpsons/The Bay employees. The Sears store at Mapleview Mall in particular opened on August 14, 1991, the same date The Bay replaced its Simpsons locations. None of Simpsons' locations in 1991 closed outright as they were all changed to either The Bay or Sears stores with minimal job losses.

Of the Simpsons stores in Quebec, three of them - Anjou, Pointe-Claire and Laval - switched to The Bay on January 29, 1989. The three locations were rebranded in March 1989 after a transition period as Simpsons stores operated by The Bay. The two others Simpsons locations in the province, in downtown Montreal and St-Bruno, were closed because they already had existing The Bay stores near them. HBC unsuccessfully tried to find a buyer for the Simpsons store in St-Bruno. The Bay store in St-Bruno eventually relocated to Simpsons' vacated location that same year. The downtown store closed on January 28, 1989 but reopened in mid-February for its final sale. After its clearance concluded on April 8, 1989, it was converted the following week (on April 15) as a Simpsons-branded liquidation centre, using 50 of the 900 employees of the original store and only two of the floors. The building later sat vacant for many years in the heart of the city's shopping district until 1999 when it was turned into a mall named Carrefour Industrielle Alliance, anchored by La Maison Simons and Famous Players (today Scotiabank Theatre).

The Simpsons stores outside of the Greater Toronto Area and Quebec were actually the first to be converted to The Bay in 1986. This included the stores in the province of Nova Scotia as well as Ontario locations in London, Kitchener, Kingston and Windsor. Like the ones in the Toronto and Montreal areas, many of these The Bay stores are still standing including those at White Oaks Mall, Cataraqui Centre, Fairview Park Mall, Devonshire Mall, Mic Mac Mall and Mayflower Mall.

After the Simpsons chain ceased to exist in 1991, the Hudson's Bay Company continued to accept Simpsons credit cards in its The Bay and Zellers stores until the company launched the HBC credit card in 2001.

The Canadian Intellectual Property Office database reports that the trademark to the name "Simpsons" was owned by Sears Canada from 2001 to 2008. It was purchased from the Hudson's Bay Company in 2001, ten years after the name had been retired. In 2008, Sears Canada transferred all of its trademarks (including the Simpsons trademark) to 1373639 Alberta Ltd., which appears to be a shell company of Sears Canada.

St. Regis Room and West End Shop 

The two most "exclusive" clothing departments in the former Simpsons downtown Toronto location, the St. Regis Room (now known as the Room and extensively renovated in late 2009 by Yabu Pushelberg) for women and the West End Shop for men, are still in operation at the Bay's downtown Toronto Queen Street store.  Designers in the St. Regis Room include Givenchy, Christian Lacroix, Valentino, Armani Collezioni, Louis Féraud, Karl Lagerfeld, Balmain, Andrew Gn, Lida Baday, Bellville Sassoon, David Hayes, and others. The West End shop designers include Hugo Boss, Strellson, and others.

While operated by Simpsons, the St. Regis Room offered some of the most exclusive fashion collections in Canada. Christian Dior, Oscar de la Renta, Yves Saint Laurent, Claude Montana, André Courrèges, and many others were featured in this luxury store.

Governance

Chairman of the Board 
Sir Joseph W. Flavelle, 1925–1929
Harris H. Fudger, 1929–1930
vacant, 1930–1948
Charles L. Burton, 1948–1956
Edgar G. Burton, 1956–1968
G. Allan Burton, 1968–1978

President 
Robert Simpson, 1896–1897
Harris H. Fudger, 1898–1929
Charles L. Burton, 1929–1948
Edgar G. Burton, 1948–1964
G. Allan Burton, 1964–1970
Charles B. Stewart, 1970–1976
Edgar G. Burton Jr, 1976–1978

See also 
Hudson's Bay Company
Hudson's Bay (department store)
List of department stores by country#Canada
Hudson's Bay Queen Street

References

Note

External links 
 Simpsons - The Store
 
 HBC Heritage: The Robert Simpson Company
 Emporis Listing of Toronto flagship

Retail companies established in 1872
Retail companies disestablished in 1991
Defunct retail companies of Canada
Department stores of Canada
Hudson's Bay Company